All Saints’ Church is a Grade I listed Church of England parish in the Diocese of Southwell and Nottingham in Cotgrave.

History
The church dates from the 12th century, and was restored between 1877 and 1878 by Evans and Jolley. An arson attack in 1996 caused considerable damage but the church was restored.

During an outbreak of the plague in 1637 the church was used as a food store for the village during the outbreak. Money for goods was disinfected as it was passed  through a hollowed out stone filled with vinegar to the men who had locked themselves away in the church. The stone is still in the church.

Bells
The church enjoys a ring of eight bells, most made by John Taylor & Co. A team of ringers practice regularly (Fridays and Sundays).

Clock
A new clock was installed in 1865 by Reuben Bosworth.

References

Grade I listed churches in Nottinghamshire
Church of England church buildings in Nottinghamshire
All Saints' Church